The 2018–19 season of the Hoofdklasse was played in four leagues, two Saturday leagues and two Sunday leagues. The champions of each group promoted directly to the 2019–20 Derde Divisie. The 2018–19 Hoofdklasse started on Saturday 1 September 2018.

Play-offs

Promotion 
In each competition teams play periods of 10 games, three times per season (30 games per season). After each period the best team which has not yet qualified earns a spot in the play-offs for the Derde Divisie as the period champion. If a period winner ends the season as champions, they will be replaced by the highest ranked team not yet qualified for the play-offs. In total 12 (substitute) period winners and 4 teams from the Derde Divisie compete for 3 spots in next seasons Derde Divisie.

Due to the removal of Papendorp from the league, there have been only 2 periods of 14 games each in the Hoofdklasse B Sunday. The highest ranked team not yet qualified for the play-offs was assigned as third period winner.

Relegation 
The teams in place 13 and 14 at the end of the season fight against relegation in the relegation play-offs. They face the period champions of the Eerste Klasse.

Saturday A

Teams

Standings

Saturday B

Teams

Standings

Sunday A

Teams

Standings

Sunday B

Teams

Standings

Promotion/relegation play-offs Hoofdklasse and Eerste Klasse 
 Saturday 
The numbers 13 and 14 from each of the 2018–19 Hoofdklasse Saturday leagues (2 times 2 teams) and 3 (substitute) period winners of each of the 2018–19 Eerste Klasse Saturday leagues (5 times 3 teams), making 19 teams, decide in a 3-round single match knockout system, which 3 teams play next season in the 2019–20 Hoofdklasse Saturday leagues. The remaining 16 teams play next season in the 2019–20 Eerste Klasse Saturday leagues.

First round
The 2 highest ranked Hoofdklasse teams (numbers 13) are released from playing the first round. Out of the 2 lowest ranked Hoofdklasse teams (numbers 14) and the 5 highest ranked (substitute) period winners (HPWs), 3 more teams are by draw released from playing the first round. The remaining 14 teams are paired by draw in such a way that, a HK or HPW team will always play a lowest ranked (substitute) period winner (LPW), and the highest ranked team gets the home advantage. The ranking order is HPW, HK, middle ranked (substitute) period winner (MPW) and LPW teams. If 2 equally ranked teams face each other, the order in which the 2 teams are drawn decides on the home advantage.

Second round
The 7 winners of the first round and the 5 teams released from playing the first round, making 12 teams, are paired by draw. The highest ranked team gets the home advantage. The ranking order is identical as in the first round.

Finals
The 6 winners of the second round are paired by draw. Matches are played on neutral ground and the 3 winners play next season in the 2019–20 Hoofdklasse Saturday leagues.

 Qualified Teams 

 Results 

 Sunday 
The numbers 13 and 14 from each of the 2018–19 Hoofdklasse Sunday leagues (2 times 2 teams) and 3 (substitute) period winners of each of the 2018–19 Eerste Klasse Sunday leagues (6 times 3 teams), making 22 teams, decide in a 4-round single match knockout system, which 2 teams play next season in the 2019–20 Hoofdklasse Sunday leagues. The remaining 20 teams play next season in the 2019–20 Eerste Klasse Sunday leagues.

First round
The Hoofdklasse teams and 6 highest ranked (substitute) period winners (HPWs) are released from playing the first round. The 12 remaining (substitute) period winners are paired by draw in such a way that, a middle (substitute) period winner (MPW) will always play a lowest ranked (substitute) period winner (LPW). The MPW teams also get the home advantage.

Second round
The 6 winners of the first round and the 10 teams released from playing the first round, making 16 teams, are paired by draw in such a way that, two HPW teams can never face each other. The highest ranked team gets the home advantage. The ranking order is HPW, highest ranked Hoofdklasse (HHK) teams (numbers 13), lowest ranked Hoofdklasse (LHK) teams (numbers 14), MPW and LPW teams. If 2 equally ranked teams face each other, the order in which the 2 teams are drawn decides on the home advantage.

Third round
The 8 winners of the first round are paired by draw. The highest ranked team gets the home advantage. The ranking order is identical as in the second round.

Finals
The 4 winners of the third round are paired by draw. Matches are played on neutral ground and the 2 winners play next season in the 2019–20 Hoofdklasse Sunday leagues.

 Qualified Teams 

 Results 

 Extra match 
Because JVC Cuijk, relegated from the Derde Divisie, decided to stop playing football at top amateur levels completely, due to lack of the necessary funds, an extra spot became available in the Hoofdklasse Sunday leagues. Therefore the two teams who lost in the fourth round of the play-offs were given a second chance. In an extra match, on neutral ground, these teams competed for the spot that became available.

Sources 
 hollandsevelden.nl

References 

2018-19
4
2018–19 in European fifth tier association football leagues